Under the Lilacs  is a children's novel by Louisa May Alcott, first published in 1878.

Plot 

Bab and Betty, two little girls, are having a tea party with their dolls when an unknown dog appears and steals their cake. The girls find the dog, Sancho, along with his owner Ben Brown, a run-away from the circus who is hiding in their play barn in a carriage. They discover that Ben is a horse master and when he is taken in by the Moss', they get him a job on a neighboring farm. It is there that he can work with horses and drive cows. Ben eventually finds out that his father, who he loved dearly, was dead. A neighbor, Miss Celia, helps him through his grief and he moves in with her and her brother Thornton who is fourteen. He has a job, and a family, and an opportunity for education. Ben has a wonderful life now, but his life in the circus was full of adventure and excitement which is a struggle for Ben. Many adventures and summer-happenings go on in Celia's house, as Ben slowly finds his place among his friends. Sancho gets lost and later is found by Betty with his tail cut off. Sancho's temper is therefore affected forever prompting him to be unfriendly to tramps and strangers, Ben is accused of stealing, Miss Celia gets hurt and Ben takes a wild ride on her horse, Lita. They have an archery competition, where Ben emerges as the winner almost beaten by Bab. In the end Ben's father is revealed to be alive and he comes home. There they both settle down.

See also

References

External links
Project Gutenburg
Full text version of Under the Lilacs
 

1878 American novels
American children's novels
Novels by Louisa May Alcott
1870s children's books